Victor Auguste Duperré (4 August 1825 – 26 March 1900) was a French naval commander.

He was born in Paris, and served as Commander of the Naval Division of the Western Coasts of Africa, effectively Colonial head of Gabon ("Colony of Gorée and Dependencies") between 1869 and 1870.  He later became governor of Cochinchina (1874–77).

References
Victor Auguste DUPERRÉ at the "Espace Tradition de l'École Marine" website.

1825 births
1900 deaths
French Navy officers
Governors of Cochinchina